Senator Marable may refer to:

John Hartwell Marable (1786–1844), Tennessee State Senate
Richard Marable (born 1949), Georgia State Senate